Martin John Spalding (May 23, 1810 – February 7, 1872) was an American prelate of the Roman Catholic Church. He served as Bishop of Louisville (1850–1864) and Archbishop of Baltimore (1864–1872). He advocated aid for freed slaves following the American Civil War. Spalding attended the First Vatican Council, where he first opposed, and then supported, a dogmatic proclamation of papal infallibility.

Early life and education
Martin Spalding was born in Rolling Fork, Kentucky, the sixth of eight children of Richard and Henrietta (née Hamilton) Spalding. His ancestors were originally from England (although one great-grandmother was Irish), and settled in Maryland around the middle of the 17th century. His paternal grandfather, Benedict Spalding, moved to Kentucky from St. Mary's County in 1790. His mother's family, likewise from Maryland, moved to Kentucky a year later. His parents married in 1801. Martin was a distant cousin of Catherine Spalding, co-founder of the Sisters of Charity of Nazareth.

When Martin was only five or six years of age, his mother died and he was confided to the care of his oldest sister and paternal grandmother. His father subsequently remarried twice, and had a total of twenty-one children. Martin was sent to a country school run by a Mr. Merryweather at age eight, and received his First Communion two years later.

In 1821, he entered the newly established St. Mary's College in Lebanon, where he became a favorite pupil of Rev. William Byrne, and was even made professor of mathematics at age fourteen. He graduated in 1826 and, having resolved to join the priesthood, entered St. Thomas Seminary in Bardstown in September of that same year. He remained in Bardstown for four years, dividing his time between studying philosophy and theology and teaching at the adjoining St. Joseph's College.

In 1830, he was sent by Bishop Benedict Joseph Flaget to continue his studies at the Pontifical Urbaniana University in Rome. He fell severely ill during the course of his studies, but eventually recovered his health.

In 1834, he earned a Doctor of Divinity degree following a public defense of 256 propositions, which covered a wide range of subjects including theology, church history, and canon law.

Priesthood
While in Rome, Spalding was ordained a priest by Cardinal Carlo Maria Pedicini on August 13, 1834. He celebrated his first Mass over the tomb of Saint Peter in the subterranean chapel of St. Peter's Basilica. 

He departed from Rome two days later, and arrived at New York in October of that same year. On his return to Kentucky, he passed through Philadelphia, Pennsylvania, where he was allowed to preach his first sermon in America by Bishop Francis Patrick Kenrick (his former professor at St. Thomas Seminary). 

Spalding arrived in Kentucky in December, and was immediately named rector of St. Joseph's Cathedral and professor of philosophy at St. Thomas Seminary. In addition to these duties, he became the first editor of the weekly Catholic Advocate in 1835; he also founded the Advocate'''s successor, The Louisville Guardian.

In 1838, Spalding was elected president of St. Joseph's College. He was largely unhappy in his administrative roles because of a temperamental incompatibility with Bishop Guy Ignatius Chabrat. At his own request, he was released from the presidency of St. Joseph's and named pastor of St. Peter Church in Lexington in 1840. Upon the transfer of the episcopal see of the diocese to Louisville in 1841, he resumed his role as rector of St. Joseph's Cathedral in Bardstown. He later succeeded Rev. Ignatius A. Reynolds as vicar general of the Diocese of Louisville in 1844.  Given the advanced age of Bishop Flaget and the progressive blindness of Bishop Chabrat, he assumed many of the administrative duties of the diocese.

During his priestly ministry, he also assisted the missions in the Diocese of Nashville, Tennessee, and published D'Aubigné's "History of the Reformation" Reviewed (1844), Sketches of the Early Catholic Missions of Kentucky (1844), and General Evidences of Catholicity (1847). He built a reputation as a gifted preacher and lecturer.

Episcopacy

Louisville

On April 18, 1848, Spalding was appointed coadjutor bishop of Louisville and titular bishop of Lengone by Pope Pius IX. He received his episcopal consecration on the following September 10 from Bishop Flaget, with Bishops Kenrick and Richard Pius Miles serving as co-consecrators, at the Cathedral of Louisville. Bishop Kenrick's brother, Archbishop Peter Richard Kenrick, preached the sermon for the occasion. Spalding selected as his episcopal motto: Auspice Maria (Latin: "Under the protection of Mary"). When Bishop Flaget died on February 11, 1850, Spalding automatically succeeded him as Bishop of Louisville.

At the time of Spalding's ascension, the diocese comprised the entire state of Kentucky and included over 30,000 Catholics, 43 churches, 10 chapels, and 40 priests. One of his first acts as ordinary was to visit every parish, school, and other institution in the diocese. He took a special interest in children, establishing an orphanage for boys in 1850. He continued the construction of the Cathedral of the Assumption in Louisville, a project that had been launched during the tenure of his predecessor. The new cathedral was dedicated by Archbishop John Baptist Purcell in October 1852. That same year, he attended the first Plenary Council of Baltimore. The Council successfully petitioned the Holy See to divide the Diocese of Louisville, and the Diocese of Covington was erected in 1853, comprising the part of the state east of the Kentucky River. In order to address the shortage of clergy in his diocese, Spalding traveled Europe for a year and recruited the services of a number of priests and the Xaverian Brothers. During his visit to Belgium, he conceived the idea of establishing the American College at Louvain, which was later opened in 1857.

In August 1855, Spalding faced an anti-Catholic riot, known as Bloody Monday. Political opponents of the Democratic Party and supporters of the Know Nothing movement claimed that foreign-born Catholics intended to subvert the government, and Spalding himself was accused of harboring weapons in various churches. This led to a series of riots that resulted in the deaths of anywhere between 22 and over 100 German and Irish Catholic immigrants. The Cathedral of the Assumption, however, was spared from destruction by Mayor John Barbee, himself reportedly a member of the Know Nothing Party. Following the riots' end, Spalding wrote, "I entreat all to pause and reflect, to commit no violence, to believe no idle rumors, and to cultivate that peace and love which are characteristics of the religion of Christ." He played a leading role at the three provincial councils of Cincinnati in 1855, 1858, and 1861. He was also an outspoken advocate for the Catholic school system, denouncing public schools as "godless".

At the beginning of the American Civil War, Spalding ordered all churches in the diocese to pray for peace. Although he sought to avoid "angry political discussions", he published a piece on the war in L'Osservatore Romano that clearly demonstrated his sympathy laid with the Confederacy. He even secretly denounced Archbishop Purcell, a staunch supporter of the Union, to his superiors in Rome. He recognized slavery as "a great social evil", but asked, "But how can we free ourselves of [slavery] without ruining our country and causing injury to the poor slaves themselves?" He also remarked that "those who are in such a way liberated ordinarily become miserable vagabonds, drunkards and thieves." In 1861, he closed St. Joseph's College and converted its facilities into a hospital for soldiers.

By the end of Spalding's tenure in Louisville, the diocese included 70,000 Catholics and 85 churches. He also published Sketches of the Life, Times, and Character of the Rt. Rev. Benedict Joseph Flaget (1852), Miscellanea (1855), and a two-volume History of the Protestant Reformation (1860).

Baltimore
Following the death of Bishop Francis Kenrick (who had been transferred to the Archdiocese of Baltimore from Philadelphia in 1851), Spalding was appointed the seventh Archbishop of Baltimore on May 3, 1864. His installation took place at the Cathedral of the Assumption on the following July 31.

After founding the House of the Good Shepherd, Spalding conducted a visitation of the archdiocese, during which he administered Confirmation to 8,000 people. He established more parishes and institutions per year and introduced more religious orders than any other Archbishop of Baltimore. One of the institutions he founded was St. Mary's Industrial School, a home for wayward boys. He recruited priests from All Hallows College near Dublin and from the American College at Louvain. He also organized the Society of Saint Vincent de Paul as well as the Association of St. Joseph, a society dedicated to the care of destitute girls. In 1865, he issued a defense of Pius IX's Syllabus of Errors, which many Americans viewed as a condemnation of the basic principles of their system of government. For instance, he declared, "Freedom of worship is condemned when it implies a right not given by Christ, and insists on the right of introducing false religion into a country where it does not exist. It is not only not censurable, but commendable, and the only thing practicable in countries like ours." He also spoke out forcefully against intermarriage between Catholics and Protestants ("alliances so fraught with evil") and Freemasonry ("a human substitute for a divine religion").

Following the end of the Civil War, Spalding made an emotional appeal for financial aid to the defeated South, posing the question, "Can we be held blameless before God if our brethren, whom we are solemnly commanded to love even as ourselves, should perish through our coldness and neglect?" In response, the Catholics of Baltimore donated a total of $10,000 to relief efforts in the South. He also took a special interest in the spiritual welfare of newly freed African Americans. Writing to Archbishop John McCloskey, he said, "Four million of these unfortunates are thrown on our charity, and they silently but eloquently appeal to us for help." He invited Rev. Herbert Vaughan and the Mill Hill Fathers from England to minister exclusively among freedmen. In October 1866, he presided over the Second Plenary Council of Baltimore.

First Vatican Council
In 1867, Spalding visited Rome to participate in the centenary celebration of the martyrdom of St. Peter. He returned to Rome two years later to attend the First Vatican Council, where he was a member of the Commission on Faith and of the Commission on Postulata'' which had to examine all the matters proposed for deliberation before they were presented to the Council. While he firmly believed in papal infallibility, Spalding initially considered that its dogmatic definition would be unnecessary and inexpedient. Instead, he favored an implicit over an explicit definition, as he believed the latter would likely "excite controversies now slumbering and almost extinct." However, Spalding reversed his mind on the necessity of an explicit definition of infallibility after being drawn into a dispute with Bishop Félix Dupanloup and after the governments of France, Germany, Italy, and Spain joined forces in opposition to a definition. He stated, "I should regard as the greatest misfortune of my life to have contributed in any way whatever to cause even a single one of my brothers to falter in perfect obedience to the authority of the Church." Immediately after the final vote on infallibility, he addressed a pastoral letter to Baltimore, in which he explained the necessity of such a definition and attacked its numerous misrepresentations. He then visited Savoy and Switzerland to regain his health, expecting to return to Rome when the Council reassembled. However, the capture of Rome by King Victor Emmanuel II made this impossible, and Spalding returned home.

Spalding, who suffered from poor health throughout his life, became greatly impaired in his final years. A short time before Christmas 1871, he went to New York to attend a meeting of bishops. On his return home, he caught a severe cold which developed into an acute form of bronchitis. He died over a month later at age 61, and was buried in the crypt of the Cathedral of the Assumption.

See also

 Catholic Church hierarchy
 Catholic Church in the United States
 Historical list of the Catholic bishops of the United States
 List of Catholic bishops of the United States
 Lists of patriarchs, archbishops, and bishops  
 John Lancaster Spalding

References

External links

 
 
 Roman Catholic Archdiocese of Baltimore
 The Ultramontanist: Archbishop Martin John Spalding, the Baltimore Catechism, and Babe Ruth...

1810 births
1872 deaths
19th-century Roman Catholic archbishops in the United States
Roman Catholic archbishops of Baltimore
Burials at the Basilica of the National Shrine of the Assumption of the Blessed Virgin Mary
People from Kentucky